The 35th Los Angeles Film Critics Association Awards, given by the Los Angeles Film Critics Association (LAFCA), honored the best in film for 2009.

Winners

Best Picture:
The Hurt Locker
Runner-up: Up in the Air
Best Director:
Kathryn Bigelow – The Hurt Locker
Runner-up: Michael Haneke – The White Ribbon (Das weiße Band)
Best Actor:
Jeff Bridges – Crazy Heart
Runner-up: Colin Firth – A Single Man
Best Actress:
Yolande Moreau – Séraphine
Runner-up: Carey Mulligan – An Education
Best Supporting Actor:
Christoph Waltz – Inglourious Basterds
Runner-up: Peter Capaldi – In the Loop
Best Supporting Actress:
Mo'Nique – Precious
Runner-up: Anna Kendrick – Up in the Air
Best Screenplay:
Jason Reitman and Sheldon Turner – Up in the Air
Runner-up: Jesse Armstrong, Simon Blackwell, Armando Iannucci, and Tony Roche – In the Loop
Best Cinematography:
Christian Berger – The White Ribbon (Das weiße Band)
Runner-up: Barry Ackroyd – The Hurt Locker
Best Production Design:
Philip Ivey – District 9
Runner-up: Rick Carter and Robert Stromberg – Avatar
Best Music Score:
T Bone Burnett and Stephen Bruton – Crazy Heart
Runner-up: Alexandre Desplat – Fantastic Mr. Fox
Best Foreign-Language Film:
Summer Hours (L'heure d'été) • France
Runner-up: The White Ribbon (Das weiße Band) • Germany
Best Documentary/Non-Fiction Film (TIE):
The Beaches of Agnès (Les plages d'Agnès)
The Cove
Best Animation:
Fantastic Mr. Fox
Runner-up: Up
New Generation Award:
Neill Blomkamp – District 9
Career Achievement Award:
Jean-Paul Belmondo
The Douglas Edwards Experimental/Independent Film/Video Award:
Anders Edström and C. W. Winter – The Anchorage
Special Citation:
In honor of the 50th anniversary of the French New Wave

References

External links
 35th Annual Los Angeles Film Critics Association Awards

2009
Los Angeles Film Critics Association Awards
Los Angeles Film Critics Association Awards
Los Angeles Film Critics Association Awards
Los Angeles Film Critics Association Awards